Stygia australis is a species of moth of the family Cossidae. It is found in France, Italy, Portugal and Spain.

The larvae feed on the roots of Echium species.

References

External links

Lepiforum.de

Moths described in 1804
Stygiinae
Moths of Europe
Taxa named by Pierre André Latreille